Karen O'Donnell is an American Democratic politician from Waltham, Massachusetts. She represented the 10th Middlesex district in the Massachusetts House of Representatives from 1993 to 1995.

See also
 1993-1994 Massachusetts legislature

References

Year of birth missing
Year of death missing
Members of the Massachusetts House of Representatives
Women state legislators in Massachusetts
20th-century American women politicians
20th-century American politicians
People from Waltham, Massachusetts